Parliamentary elections were held in Cyprus on 8 December 1985. The result was a victory for the Democratic Rally, which won 19 of the 56 seats. Voter turnout was 94.6%.

Results

References

Legislative election
Cyprus
Legislative elections in Cyprus
Cyprus